The following is a list of aircraft of the Imperial Japanese Navy Air Service from its inception in 1912 until its dissolution in 1945.

World War I
Adopted prior to 1918

Bombers
Farman MF.11 1914 Ship-based light bomber floatplane

Reconnaissance and liaison
Farman MF.7 Longhorn 1913 light bomber and reconnaissance aircraft
Yokosho Ro-gō Kō-gata 1918 reconnaissance seaplane

Interwar
Adopted between 1918 and 1937

Fighters
Gloster Sparrowhawk 1921 carrier-borne biplane fighter 
Mitsubishi 1MF 1923 carrier-borne biplane fighter (Type 10 Fighter)
Nakajima A1N 1930 carrier-borne biplane fighter
Nakajima A2N 1932 carrier-borne biplane fighter
Nakajima A4N 1935 carrier-borne biplane fighter
Mitsubishi A5M Claude 1935 Navy carrier-based fighter

Bombers
Mitsubishi 1MT 1922 carrier torpedo bomber
Mitsubishi B1M 1923 carrier torpedo bomber
Mitsubishi B2M 1932 carrier torpedo bomber
Kugisho B3Y 1932 carrier torpedo bomber
Mitsubishi G3M Nell 1934 Navy land-based bomber 
Aichi D1A Susie 1934 Navy carrier dive bomber
Yokosuka B4Y Jean 1935 biplane torpedo bomber

Reconnaissance and liaison
Mitsubishi 2MR 1923 carrier reconnaissance aircraft (Type 10 Carrier Reconnaissance Aircraft)

Trainers
Yokosho K1Y 1924 primary trainer
Yokosuka K2Y 1928 primary trainer
Kyushu K10W Oak Type 2 intermediate trainer.
Mitsubishi K3M Pine 1930 naval crew trainer.

Transports
Hitachi LXG1 1934 (Liaison and communication)

Flying boats and seaplanes
Yokosuka E1Y 1926 reconnaissance seaplane
Hiro H1H 1926 flying boat
Nakajima E2N 1929 reconnaissance seaplane
Hiro H2H 1929 flying boat
Aichi E3A 1930 reconnaissance seaplane
Nakajima E4N 1930 reconnaissance seaplane
Yokosuka E5Y 1930 reconnaissance seaplane
Kawanishi H3K 1932 flying boat
Kawanishi E5K 1932 reconnaissance seaplane
Yokosuka E6Y 1932 submarine based floatplane 
Kawanishi E7K Alf 1933 reconnaissance seaplane 
Hiro H4H 1933 flying boat
Nakajima E8N Dave 1934 reconnaissance seaplane 
Kawanishi H6K Mavis 1936 recon. flying boat; formerly - Navy Type 97 Flying Boat
Mitsubishi F1M Pete 1936 observation seaplane 
Yokosuka H5Y Cherry  1936 flying boat 
Aichi E10A 1936 reconnaissance flying boat

World War II
Second Sino-Japanese War, Pacific War, and China-Burma-India theatre

Fighters
Mitsubishi A6M Zero 零戦 "Reisen" Zeke 1939 Navy carrier fighter (type 0), the "Zero"
Mitsubishi A7M 烈風 "Reppu" Sam 1944 Navy carrier-based fighter
Seversky A8V1 Type S Two Seat Fighter Late 1930s Two-seat Seversky P-35
Nakajima J1N 月光 "Gekko" Irving 1941 Navy land-based night fighter 
Mitsubishi J2M 雷電 "Raiden" Jack 1942 Navy land-based interceptor 
Nakajima J5N 天雷 "Tenrai" 1944 Navy land-based interceptor
Kyushu J7W 震電 "Shinden" 1945 Navy interceptor
Mitsubishi J8M1 秋水 "Shusui" 1945 Rocket interceptor based on the Messerschmitt Me 163, for Army Mitsubishi Ki-200 and Navy
Mitsubishi J8M2 秋水改 "Shusui-kai" Rocket interceptor, Navy version of Army Mitsubishi Ki-202
Nakajima J9Y 橘花 "Kikka" 1945 Experimental Navy jet-powered fighter.
Kawanishi N1K-J 紫電 "Shiden" 1942 Navy ground-based derivative of the N1K
Kawanishi P1Y2-S 極光 1944 Navy night-fighter derivative of the Yokosuka P1Y
Aichi S1A 電光 "Denko" 1945 Navy night fighter

Bombers
Mitsubishi B5M Mabel 1937 Navy carrier torpedo bomber
Nakajima B5N Kate  1937 Navy carrier torpedo bomber 
Aichi D3A Val 1938  Navy carrier dive bomber 
Mitsubishi G4M Betty 1939 Navy land-based bomber 
Yokosuka D4Y 彗星 "Suisei"  Judy 1940 dive bomber
Nakajima B6N 天山 "Tenzan" Jill 1941 Navy torpedo bomber
Aichi B7A 流星 "Ryusei" Grace 1942 Navy carrier torpedo bomber 
Kyushu Q1W 東海 "Tokai"  Lorna 1943 Navy anti-submarine patrol bomber
Yokosuka P1Y 銀河 "Ginga" Frances 1943 medium bomber 
Nakajima G8N 連山 "Renzan"  Rita 1944 Navy long-range heavy bomber
Tachikawa Ki-74 Patsy 1944 bomber, reconnaissance

Reconnaissance and liaison
Mitsubishi C5M 1937 Babs reconnaissance aircraft
Nakajima C6N 彩雲 "Saiun"  Myrt 1943 Navy reconnaissance plane
Yokosuka R2Y 景雲 "Keiun"  1945 reconnaissance

Transports
Kawanishi H6K2/4-L 1938 (Transport Flying boat)
Kawanishi H6K3 1939 (Transport Flying boat)
Kawanishi H8K2-L Seiku (Transport version of H8K)
Kawanishi E11K1 (Merchant Transport Hydroplane)
Mitsubishi K3M3-L "Pine" (Light Transport)
Mitsubishi L3Y1/2 (Armed Transport)
Mitsubishi G6M1/2-L (Armed Transport)
Mitsubishi L4M1 (Personnel Transport)
Nakajima C2N1 (Light transport)
Nakajima L1N1 (Personnel Transport)
Nakajima G5N2-L Shinzan "Liz" (Merchant transport)
Nihon L7P1 (Light amphibious transport)
Showa/Nakajima L2D2 "Tabby" (Merchants and Personnel Transport)
Yokosuka H5Y1 "Cherry" (Transport Hydroplane)
Kyushu K10W11 "Oak" (liaison and Communications)
Nakajima A4N1 (liaisons)
Aichi E13A1 "Jake" (liaisons and officer transport)

Flying boats and seaplanes
Aichi E11A Laura 1937 reconnaissance flying boat 
Yokosuka E14Y Glenn 1939 submarine based floatplane 
Aichi E13A Jake 1940 
Aichi H9A  1940 
Kawanishi H8K Emily  1941   Flying Boat
Kawanishi H8K2-L 晴空 "Seiku" Emily Flying Boat
Kawanishi E15K 紫雲 "Shiun"  Norm 1941 reconnaissance seaplane 
Kawanishi N1K 強風 "Kyofu"  Rex  1942 floatplane fighter
Aichi E16A 瑞雲 "Zuiun" Paul 1942 reconnaissance seaplane 
Nakajima A6M2-N Rufe  1942  Mitsubishi Zero floatplane version
Aichi M6A 晴嵐 "Seiran" 1943 submarine-based seaplane

Purpose-built special attack aircraft
Yokosuka MXY7 桜花 "Ohka" Baka 1944 manned flying bomb

See also
 List of military aircraft of Japan

Japanese Navy, List of aircraft of
Imperial Japanese Navy Air Service
Aircraft